Kleparz is a neighbourhood in Kraków, Poland, situated directly to the north of the Old Town, marking the beginning of the Royal Road. It was a separate town between 1366 and 1792. It is now part of the Stare Miasto administrative district.

History
The first known settlement within the present Kleparz boundaries was founded before 1184. In this year the Church of St. Florian was erected by the Kraków Bishop Gedko. The settlement grew very fast in number and size, so it soon was known as the Alta civitas and had about one thousand inhabitants as well as 2,380 horses. Casimir the Great granted it location rights in 1366 and named it Florencja, after St. Florian's Church.

Houses of timber were built around the  market square and its citizens were mainly  craftsmen, including smiths and tailors. In the next century the new name Kleparz  (Latin Clepardia) replaced the previous one. Kleparz was burned down several times during wars or by great fires in 1476, 1528, 1655, 1657, 1755 and 1768. In 1792 it was incorporated into the city of Kraków by the decision of the Great Sejm.

In the 19th century Kleparz was rebuilt with new residential mansions in neoclassicist and art nouveau styles.

Interesting sights
The most interesting sights in Kleparz are the Kleparz Market Square with colorful stalls and the Jan Matejko Square located almost side by side and flanked by the Academy of Fine Arts and the St. Florian Church with the Grunwald Monument at its centre.

Notes and references

St. Florian's Church at travel.yahoo.com
St. Florian's Church at krakow4u.pl
Kleparz at what-where-when.pl
Story of St. Florian's relics (Polish language only)

Districts of Kraków